Robert Kevin Herbert was an American linguist who died in July 2007, in Costa Rica. He was a phonologist and sociolinguist, specializing in the field of African languages.

He taught at the State University of New York (SUNY), Binghamton, for 22 years. He was chair of the Anthropology Department from 1996 to 2001. For some years in the 1990s, Bob was professor and head of the Department of African Languages at the University of the Witwatersrand, in Johannesburg, South Africa. He was subsequently provost and vice-president for academic affairs at Youngstown State University, Ohio.

He famously organized the linguistics conference, "Sociolinguistics in Africa", in January/February 1990, at the University of the Witwatersrand, during which conference the African National Congress was unbanned.

His academic work extended to an important hypothesis on the genesis and transmission of "isihlonipho sabafazi", that is, the complex system of linguistic avoidance traditionally acquired by married Xhosa women (also called the Xhosa women's "language of respect").

Linguists from the United States
2007 deaths
State University of New York faculty
Youngstown State University faculty
Sociolinguists
Phonologists
Academic staff of the University of the Witwatersrand
Year of birth missing